Baska may refer to:

Baška, Croatia, a municipality in Croatia
Baška (Frýdek-Místek District), a municipality in the Czech Republic
Baska, Andal, a town in India
Baška, Košice-okolie District, a municipality in Slovakia
Durmuşlu or Baska, a town in Turkey
Başka 33/3, an album by Işın Karaca

See also